Herb Alpert's Vibrato Grill & Jazz is a jazz club and restaurant on Beverly Glen Circle in Bel Air, Los Angeles, to the south of Mulholland Drive. It was established by Grammy Award-winning jazz trumpeter Herb Alpert. Ariana Savalas is a regular performer at the club.

References

External links
Official site
Tripadvisor reviews

Bel Air, Los Angeles
Jazz clubs in Los Angeles
Restaurants in Los Angeles